Provincial Highway 14 (PTH 14) is a provincial highway in Manitoba. PTH 14 is a 2 lane high-speed rural highway (100 km/h) and carries relatively high traffic volumes of approximately 1800 vehicles per day. The route extends west to east from its junction with PTH 3 to its junction with PTH 75, the Lord Selkirk Highway.

Route description 

The western terminus of PTH 14 is located at PTH 3 between the neighbouring cities of Morden and Winkler. The westerly leg of PTH 3 continues the route of PTH 14. The eastern terminus is at PTH 75 south of St. Jean Baptiste. The Canadian Pacific Railway (CPR) runs through Winkler, Manitoba continuing south and parallel to PTH 14 until Plum Coulee where it intersects PTH 14 and runs north and parallel to PTH 14 until Rosenfeld where the CPR diverges north. The highway is twinned its junction with PTH 3 PTH 32. The twinning continues westerly to the city of Morden along PTH 3.

The land is shaped by the prehistoric Lake Agassiz and the shorelines of this ancient lake. The nearby city of Winkler has a population of 8,500. The town of Plum Coulee is located on the western flood plains of the Red River Valley. In 1884, the rural municipality of Rhineland began as Douglas before changing names in 1891. Horndean is a small area between Plum Coulee and Rosenfeld. The Rural Municipality of Montcalm is located in the Red River Valley and the Lord Selkirk Highway connects with three other provincial trunk highways in the R.M. The Lord Selkirk connects Pembina, North Dakota, United States with the capital city of Manitoba, Winnipeg.

Prior to 1949, Highway 14 was the designation of the highway from Winnipeg to Emerson, which is now PTH 75.

PTH 14 was designated to its current route in 1950.

Major intersections

See also 
List of Manitoba provincial highways
List of rural municipalities in Manitoba

References

External links 

Manitoba government Official Highway Map
AMM - Association of Manitoba Municipalities

014